Ga-Ramokadikadi, also known as Vlakfontein, is an affluent, large village in Ga-Matlala in the Polokwane Local Municipality of the Capricorn District Municipality of the Limpopo province of South Africa. It lies about 2 km south of Tibane and 54 km northwest of Polokwane on the Matlala Road.

Demographics 
The dominant language of the settlement is Northern Sotho, with Xitsonga as the main minority language. People of African descent are the main ethnic group, with the rest of the population consisting of Coloureds and Asians. Most of the villagers are Christians and a small minority of Muslims exists.

Infrastructure 
The settlement lies directly east of Matlala Road which connects Tibane and Polokwane. Most of the residents of the village are professionals and are economically far better off than other typical South African villagers. Matlala SAPS station, the only police station in the Ga-Matlala, is located in the village.

Education 
Ikagaleng Makobe Primary School
Motliši Secondary School

References 

Populated places in the Polokwane Local Municipality